Nadeem Baig (born 24 March 1971) is Pakistani film and television director, producer and writer from Karachi. Baig won the Lux Style Award For Best Director for Punjab Nahi Jaungi.

He made his film directional debut in 2015 with the highest grosser of the year, Jawani Phir Nahi Ani. He is a frequent collaborator with actor Humayun Saeed and has directed four of the top six highest-grossing Pakistani films of all time.

Career
Nadeem Baig began his career as a television director. He has directed various television serials such as Ladies Park (2011), Omer Dadi Aur Gharwale (2012), Annie Ki Ayegi Baraat (2012) and Pyarey Afzal (2013), 2019's highest-rated drama, which is shown by ARY Digital (Meray Paas Tum Ho) is also on his credit as director. Baig has also co-produced Takkay Ki Ayegi Baraat and Azar Ki Ayegi Baraat.

He made his Lollywood debut with the 2015 comedy film Jawani Phir Nahi Ani which became huge success at the box office and is currently the third-highest-grossing film ever. His next film was Romantic comedy film Punjab Nahi Jaungi which released on 1 September 2017, it became the second-highest-grossing Pakistani film, collecting over Rs.51 crore at the box office.

In recent years he has directed Jawani Phir Nahi Ani 2, which released on Eid-al-Adha 2018 and broke existing records in Pakistan. It was the highest-grossing Pakistani film at the time of its release and is the 2nd highest currently. His 4th film, London Nahi Jaungi, released in 2022 and became the 3rd highest-grossing Pakistani film of all time.

Films

Television

Awards and nominations
{| class="wikitable"
|-
! Year
! Award
! Category
! Nominated Work
! Result
! |Ref(s)
|-
| 2012
| 12th Lux Style Awards
| Best TV Director 
| Man Jali
| 
|-
| 2014
| 14th Lux Style Awards
| Best TV Director 
| Pyarey Afzal
| 
|-
| 2015
| 15th Lux Style Awards
| Best Film Director 
| Jawani Phir Nahi Ani
| 
|-
| 2016
| 16th Lux Style Awards
| Best TV Director 
| Dil Lagi
| 
|-
| style="text-align:center;"|2016
| 2016 ARY Film Awards
| Best Director
| Jawani Phir Nahi Ani
|
| 
|-
| style="text-align:center;"|2017
| 17th Lux Style Awards
| Best Film Director
| Punjab Nahi Jaungi
|
| 
|-
| 2018
| 18th Lux Style Awards
| Best Film Director 
| Jawani Phir Nahi Ani 2
| 
|-
| 2019
| 19th Lux Style Awards
| Best TV Director 
| Mere Paas Tum Ho
|

See also
List of film and television directors
List of Pakistani television and theatre directors

References

External links

Living people
Pakistani film directors
Pakistani film producers
Pakistani television directors
People from Karachi
1975 births